Anathallis guarujaensis is a species of orchid plant native to Brazil.

References 

guarujaensis
Flora of Brazil